Various monasteries and other religious houses have existed at various times during the Middle Ages in the city of Exeter, Devon, England. 

The Monastic buildings included:
Anglo-Saxon foundations
 Exeter Cathedral Priory, possibly founded before circa 690
 The Saxon Monastery, founded by King Æthelred of Wessex in 868
 The Benedictine Monastery, founded in 932 by King Æthelstan and dedicated to Saint Mary and Saint Peter
 The Nunnery of Saint Augustine, a nunnery of Augustinian Canonesses founded circa 968

Norman and later foundations
 The Benedictine Priory of St Nicholas, a Benedictine monastery founded in 1087
 St James Priory, a Cluniac priory founded in 1146
 Polsloe Priory, a Benedictine priory for women (a nunnery) founded circa 1159
 Exeter Blackfriars, a Dominican friary founded before 1232
 Exeter Grey Friary, a Franciscan friary founded before 1240
 Exeter Priory, a Carthusian priory licensed in 1331–2 but never established

History

The origins of monasticism in Exeter are uncertain. Christianity arrived in Britain when Exeter was still a Roman city, and Celtic Christianity was introduced to the area during the 5th century by Welsh, Irish and Breton missionaries. Exeter was part of the Romano-British kingdom of Dumnonia during the Post-Roman period, and the Saxons did not reach the city until King Centwine of Wessex defeated the British in 682. The Saxons gave the name Monkton to Exeter as a consequence of the large number of monks that it contained. According to Willibald, an Anglo-Saxon priest who wrote a "Life" of Saint Boniface, the saint was educated at a monastery in 690 in a place variously called Adestancester, Escancastre, or Examchester, names that have been identified with Exeter. Exeter was sacked by the Danes in 1003, but the Benedictine monastery was restored by Cnut in 1019.

Bishop Leofric was appointed as Bishop of Cornwall and Bishop of Crediton in 1046. In 1050 he merged the two bishoprics to create the united see of Devon and Cornwall and moved the episcopal see to Exeter. The new combined see incorporated Exeter's three monastic buildings of the time, all of which were located in Saint Peter's Close. The nunnery of Saint Augustine, the Saxon monastery and the Benedictine monastery were united to form the Cathedral Church. The monastery was suppressed and converted into a secular cathedral.

During the subsequent two centuries a number of priories and friaries were founded. These were all dissolved with the Dissolution of the Monasteries under Henry VIII and little remains. There is one building surviving from Polsloe Priory: the main part of the west range, built of the local red sandstone and believed to date from around 1320. Nothing is extant from St James Priory except a cob wall surrounding the building currently on the site, which may be the precinct wall of the priory. Parts of the Benedictine Priory of St Nicholas survive. The guest wing and a kitchen at its northern end were converted into an Elizabethan town house after dissolution, and this is now maintained as St Nicholas' Priory museum by Exeter City Council. The refectory was used as a Georgian town house and is now owned by the Exeter Historic Buildings Trust.

See also
List of monastic houses in Devon

References

Further reading
Nicholas Orme The Churches of Medieval Exeter. Exeter: Impress Books, 2014

Monasteries in Devon
Buildings and structures in Exeter
History of Exeter
Christian monasteries established in the 9th century